Connecticut's 5th State Senate district elects one member to the Connecticut State Senate. It consists of the towns of West Hartford, Burlington, and parts of Bloomfield and Farmington. It is currently represented by Democrat Derek Slap, who has been serving since 2019.

Recent elections

2020

2018

2016

2014

2012

References

05